Dyschirius aenea is a species of ground beetle in the subfamily Scaritinae. It was described by Boheman in 1849.

References

aenea
Beetles described in 1849